In organic chemistry, the phenylene group is based on a di-substituted benzene ring (arylene). For example, poly(p-phenylene) is a polymer built up from para-phenylene repeating units. The phenylene group has three structural isomers, based on which hydrogens are substituted: para-phenylene, meta-phenylene, and ortho-phenylene.

References 

Arenediyl groups